The Long Beach State 49ers football team represented California State University, Long Beach from the 1955 through 1991 seasons. The 49ers originally competed as an Independent before joining the California Collegiate Athletic Association in 1958. By the 1969 season, the 49ers joined the Pacific Coast Athletic Association (now the Big West) as a founding member, where they remained until the program was suspended following the 1991 season. Long Beach played its home games at multiple stadiums throughout their history with the most recent being Veterans Memorial Stadium, in Long Beach, California. During their 37 years of competition, the 49ers compiled an all-time record of 199 wins, 183 losses and 4 ties.  Three members of the Pro Football Hall of Fame were associated with the program during its otherwise forgettable last two years of existence, i.e., head coaches  George Allen and Willie Brown, as well as running back Terrell Davis.

History
The Long Beach State football team traces its roots to 1955 when looking to capitalize on the boosters for both USC and UCLA who resided in Long Beach, the 49ers program was established. The program would see modest success, culminating with conference titles following both the 1970 and 1971 seasons, including the 49ers lone bowl, the 1970 Pasadena Bowl. Between the 1977 and 1982 seasons, Long Beach played the majority of their home games at Anaheim Stadium prior to moving back to Veterans Memorial Stadium for the 1983 season. The 49ers would again win the PCAA championship following the 1980 season.

Before the 1990 season, the legendary  George Allen came out of retirement to coach the 49ers.  Allen led the team to an undefeated home schedule, although the overall won-loss record was 6-5.  He recruited another future member of the Pro Football Hall of Fame, a running back from San Diego Lincoln High named Terrell Davis.  Allen died on December 31, 1990, leaving the future of the program in doubt. The program continued for one more season, under rookie head coach Willie Brown, a former NFL star who like Allen and Davis is now a member of the Pro Football Hall of Fame.  The team went 2-9 in its last season. On December 10, 1991, University President Curtis McCray announced the 49ers football program would be disbanded immediately. The decision to disband the football team was prompted by financial shortfalls resulting from California's budget crisis, coupled with increased costs of operating the program and declining fan support.

Although the 49ers have not played a game since 1991, Long Beach is still the NCAA record holder in several categories. These records include: the most passes caught by a running back for both a single game and season with 18 and 99 respectively by Mark Templeton, during the 1986 season, and leading the nation in total offense with an average of 326.8 yards per game for the 1982 season.  The 49ers also lead the nation in total offense with 529 yards per game while members of the college division in 1965.

Conference championships
Long Beach won three conference championships during their tenure as a program, two outright and one shared.

† Co-champion

Recovery of game films
As many as 150 Long Beach State football games of full and partial game film have been located and are stored in Los Angeles.  The majority of the games are on 16mm film, while some of the later games are on U-matic and Betamax format tapes.  Many of the games have been transferred to digital video and are listed on the Long Beach State 49ers Football Game Film Archive website.  The story of the discovery and preservation of the game film was documented in the April 2015 issue of DIG Magazine in an article titled "Salvaged Memories".

Bring back 49er football
Student efforts to revive a Division 1AA Football program began in April 2008 and led to a referendum in March 2011. The referendum took place March 21-March 24 online, only current CSULB students were able to cast a vote.  3084 people voted total with 52% of the student body voting "no" and 48% voting "yes".

Head coaches

Long Beach had 9 head coaches through 36 years of play, with a total record of 199–183–4 (.520).

National Award Winners

All-Americans
 Leon Burns, RB- 1970 (NEA-1st; PFW-1st)

Seasons

References

 
1955 establishments in California
1991 disestablishments in California
American football teams established in 1955
American football teams disestablished in 1991